Mauricio Rodrigo Solís Mora (born 13 December 1972 in Heredia) is a Costa Rican former professional footballer who played as a defensive midfielder. 

He is one of Costa Rica's best players in the past decade. He is a tough, hard working central midfielder who is a strong tackler and is also good at distributing balls and starting attacks from the center of pitch, he is also a great finisher from long distances.

Club career
Nicknamed el Mauro, Solís began his professional career with Herediano, making his debut with the club on 5 November 1990 against Limonense. He would remain with Herediano until 1996, winning the last Costa Rican championship Herediano won in the 1992–93 season.

Years abroad
He then moved to England, signing a contract with Derby County along with compatriot Paulo Wanchope. His stay there was short, however, and he returned to CONCACAF in 1998, playing with Comunicaciones of Guatemala for a year. Solís then moved to Major League Soccer, where he played parts of the 1999 and 2000 seasons for the San Jose Clash (later San Jose Earthquakes), registering 4 goals and 1 assist in 29 starts.

After two years in MLS, Solís returned to Costa Rica, where he signed a contract with Alajuelense. He played two seasons with the team, winning championships in 2000–01 and 2001–02, before looking overseas again, signing a contract with Greek club OFI Crete to join fellow Tico Rónald Gómez. After a year with them, Solís again returned to America, playing the 2003–04 season in Mexico for Irapuato, after being brought to the team by former coach Alexandre Guimarães, then rejoined Alajuelense and in summer 2005 returned to Comunicaciones to play alongside compatriots Rolando Fonseca, Ricardo González and Jhonny Cubero.

Herediano return
In 2007, he transferred to Maccabi Netanya but his contract was terminated after preseason for certain complications so he came back to Costa Rica and decide to sign up for the teams he started his career Herediano. In March 2010 he became the 7th player to reach 300 matches for Los Florenses.

In April 2010, shortly after Herediano finish its participation in Costa Rican 2010 summer Championship, he announced his retirement from football. However, he reversed that decision when he joined Ricardo González and coach Paulo Wanchope at ambitious second division side Uruguay de Coronado in February 2011. He retired 5 months later.

International career
Solís made his debut for Costa Rica in a September 1993 friendly match against Saudi Arabia and earned a total of 110 caps, scoring 6 goals. He represented his country in 30 FIFA World Cup qualification matches and played at both the 2002 and 2006 FIFA World Cups. He also played at the 1995, 1999 and 2001 UNCAF Nations Cups as well as at the 2002 and 2003 CONCACAF Gold Cups. He also played at the 1997 and 2001 Copa América.

Solís was the second Costa Rican behind Luis Marín to reach 100 caps in June 2005 against Guatemala.

His final international was a June 2006 FIFA World Cup match against Poland.

Retirement
Solís quit Herediano and football in April 2010.
After retiring, Solis owned a bar-restaurant in Heredia.

In January he was named manager of Herediano, only to be dismissed a month later.

Personal life
Born and raised in Los Ángeles de Santo Domingo de Heredia, Solís is a son of Rodrigo Solís and María de los Ángeles Mora and is married to Katia Moreira Chaverri and has three children.

Honours
Costa Rican Championship (4):
1992–1993, 2000–01, 2001–02, 2004–05

See also
 List of men's footballers with 100 or more international caps

References

External links
 
 
 2002 World Cup profile

1972 births
Living people
People from Heredia Province
Association football midfielders
Association football central defenders
Association football defenders
Association football sweepers
Association football utility players
Costa Rican footballers
Costa Rica international footballers
1997 Copa América players
2001 UNCAF Nations Cup players
2001 Copa América players
2002 CONCACAF Gold Cup players
2002 FIFA World Cup players
2003 CONCACAF Gold Cup players
2006 FIFA World Cup players
C.S. Herediano footballers
Derby County F.C. players
Comunicaciones F.C. players
San Jose Earthquakes players
L.D. Alajuelense footballers
OFI Crete F.C. players
Irapuato F.C. footballers
Liga FPD players
Premier League players
Major League Soccer players
FIFA Century Club
Copa Centroamericana-winning players
Costa Rican expatriate footballers
Costa Rican expatriate sportspeople in England
Expatriate footballers in England
Expatriate soccer players in the United States
Expatriate footballers in Greece
Expatriate footballers in Guatemala
Expatriate footballers in Mexico
Costa Rican football managers
C.S. Herediano managers
Super League Greece players